Marie Bernard is a scientist.

Marie Bernanrd may also refer to:

Marie Bernard (composer) (born 1951), Canadian composer who won at the 12th Genie Awards
Marie Bernard (child saint) on List of child saints
Sister Mary Bernard or Bernadette Soubirous, saint
Marie Françoise Bernard (1819–1901), credited as the father of physiology